Pennycuick may refer to:

 Charles Edward Ducat Pennycuick (1844–1902), British colonial administrator
 John Pennycuick (disambiguation), the name of various people
 Kenneth Pennycuick (1911–1995), British philatelist
 Rupert Pennycuick (1893–1963), Australian cricketer
 Tracy Pennycuick, American politician

See also 

 Penicuik, a town in Midlothian, Scotland
 Pennyquick, a place near Bath, Somerset, England